Anand Sivasubramaniam is Distinguished Professor of Computer Science and Engineering at The Pennsylvania State University. He is well known for his work in computer architecture, computer systems, data centers and computer systems power management.

Education 
Anand did his schooling at Padma Seshadri Bala Bhavan, Nungambakkam, Chennai. He graduated All India 1st in the All India Senior School Certificate Examination in 1985.

Anand completed his BTech from the Indian Institute of Technology, Madras in 1989 and earned his PhD from Georgia Tech in 1995 with Umakishore Ramachandran as his doctoral adviser. He has been faculty at Penn State since 1995.

Awards and honors 
Anand received the NSF CAREER award in 1997. He received the Penn State Department of Computer Science and Engineering Faculty Teaching award in 2003. He has received multiple IBM Faculty Research awards, Google Research awards and an HP innovation award. He was awarded the IEEE fellow in 2012 “for contributions to power management of storage systems and high performance computer systems” and the ACM Fellow in 2017 "for contributions to power management of datacenters and high-end computer systems".

References 

Fellow Members of the IEEE
Fellows of the Association for Computing Machinery
Living people
1967 births
American electrical engineers